The 2018–19 Virginia Tech Hokies men's basketball team represented Virginia Polytechnic Institute and State University during the 2018–19 NCAA Division I men's basketball season. The Hokies were led by fifth-year head coach Buzz Williams and played their home games at Cassell Coliseum in Blacksburg, Virginia as members of the Atlantic Coast Conference. They finished the 2018–19 season 26–9, 12–6 in ACC play to finish in fifth place. They defeated Miami (FL) in the second round of the ACC tournament before losing to Florida State. They received an at-large bid to the NCAA tournament where they defeated Saint Louis and Liberty to advanced to the sweet sixteen for the first time since 1965 where they lost to ACC member Duke.

On April 3, Williams left Virginia Tech to take the Texas A&M head coaching job. The Hokies hired Wofford head coach Young as his replacement on April 7.

Previous season
The Hokies finished the 2017–18 season 21–12, 10–8 in ACC play to finish in seventh place. They lost in the second round of the ACC tournament to Notre Dame. They received an at-large bid to the NCAA tournament where they lost in the first round to Alabama.

Offseason

Departures

2018 recruiting class

Roster

Schedule and results

|-
!colspan=12 style=| Exhibition

|-
!colspan=12 style=| Non-conference regular season

|-
!colspan=12 style=| ACC regular season

|-
!colspan=12 style=| ACC Tournament

|-
!colspan=12 style=| NCAA tournament

Source

Player statistics

Rankings

^Coaches did not release a Week 2 poll.

References

Virginia Tech Hokies men's basketball seasons
Virginia Tech
Virginia Tech
Virginia Tech
Virginia Tech